George Moore was Archdeacon of Cornwall  from 15 February 1788 until his death on 12 March 1807.

References

Archdeacons of Cornwall
18th-century English Anglican priests
19th-century English Anglican priests
Alumni of Christ Church, Oxford
1807 deaths
People educated at Blundell's School